

This is a list of the Indiana state historical markers in DeKalb County.

This is intended to be a complete list of the official state historical markers placed in DeKalb County, Indiana, United States by the Indiana Historical Bureau. The locations of the historical markers and their latitude and longitude coordinates are included below when available, along with their names, years of placement, and topics as recorded by the Historical Bureau.  There are 2 historical markers located in DeKalb County.

Historical markers

See also
List of Indiana state historical markers
National Register of Historic Places listings in DeKalb County, Indiana

References

External links
Indiana Historical Marker Program
Indiana Historical Bureau

DeKalb County
Historical markers